The 2022–23 Omaha Mavericks men's basketball team represented the University of Nebraska Omaha in the 2022–23 NCAA Division I men's basketball season. The Mavericks, led by 1st-year head coach Chris Crutchfield, played their home games at Baxter Arena in Omaha, Nebraska, as members of the Summit League.

Previous season
The Mavericks finished the 2021–22 season 5–25, 4–14 in Summit League play to finish in ninth place. They lost to South Dakota State in the quarterfinals of the Summit League tournament.

Roster

Schedule and results

|-
!colspan=12 style=""| Exhibition

|-
!colspan=12 style=""| Regular season

|-
!colspan=9 style=|Summit League tournament

Sources

References 

Omaha Mavericks men's basketball seasons
Omaha Mavericks
Omaha Mavericks men's basketball
Omaha Mavericks men's basketball